Rose Festival may refer to:

Kutno Rose Festival in Kutno, Poland
Portland Rose Festival in Portland, Oregon
Rose Festival (Chandigarh) in Chandigarh, India
Texas Rose Festival in Tyler, Texas